Army of Darkness comics are based on the film of the same name published originally by Dark Horse Comics, and later by Dynamite Entertainment who initially published them through Devil's Due Publishing.

The stories follow the adventures of the Evil Dead series, Ash Williams, and has included a number of crossovers with a wide variety of characters such as Marvel Zombies, Darkman, Freddy Krueger, Jason Voorhees, Dracula, Xena, Danger Girl, and Re-Animator.

First series

Film adaptation (#1-3)

In 1992, Dark Horse published an adaptation of the film with the original ending intact. John Bolton adapted the story from the script written by Sam Raimi and Ivan Raimi, in addition to providing the artwork.

It was published as a three-issue miniseries and was released as a trade paperback by Dynamite in 2006.

Ashes 2 Ashes (#1-4)
Originally published in:  Army of Darkness: Ashes 2 Ashes #1-4 (July 2004 - October 2004)
Plot outline: The plot picks up right at the end of the film, where the wizard of Army of Darkness goes to Ash's time to tell him that he is still not in his right time and that he arrived moments before he left to go to the woods in the first film, Evil Dead. Now he once again faces the evil in the woods and encounters his self from the true present, and along with the wizard sends him to the past where the events of Army of Darkness took place. While trying to destroy the book that caused all the events of the trilogy to take place, the two travel to Egypt, where the wizard is killed and Evil Ash is resurrected. In a final battle Ash is able to destroy Evil Ash and his army with the help of the medieval warriors of Arthur's court from the third film and once again encounters Sheila; after the end of the battle everybody goes to their respective timelines, but Ash leaves the book behind, forgetting to destroy it.

It was written by Andy Hartnell, with art by Nick Bradshaw.

It was a four-issue miniseries, collected as a trade paperback which was released in late February 2005.

Shop till You Drop Dead (#1-4)

This story starts where Ashes 2 Ashes ends.

It was written by James Kuhoric, with art by Nick Bradshaw and Sanford Greene.

It was a four-issue miniseries, collected as a trade paperback which was released in November 2006.

Army of Darkness vs. Re-Animator (vol. 1) #1-4

A crossover with Herbert West from H. P. Lovecraft's short story, "Herbert West–Reanimator" and well known from the film Re-Animator and its sequels.

This story starts where Shop Till You Drop Dead ends.

This was published as issue #1-4 of the ongoing Army of Darkness series. The trade paperback was released in late October 2006.

Old School (vol. 1) #5-7
Ash returns to the cabin in the woods in an attempt to stop the evil at its source.

This was published as issue #5-7 of the series. The trade paperback was published in September 2006.

Ash vs. Dracula (Ash vs. the Classic Monsters) (vol. 1) #8-11
Ash must face Dracula, who wants to use the power of the Necronomicon to plunge the world in eternal night. Introduces Dynamite's new character: Eva, Daughter of the Dragon.

This was published as issues #8-11 of the series. The trade paperback collects the Ash vs. Dracula series and The Death of Ash.

The Death of Ash (vol. 1) #12-13
The story starts where Ash vs. Dracula ends and leads up to Marvel Zombies vs. Army of Darkness.

This was published as issues #12-13 of the series.

Second series

From The Ashes (vol. 2) #1-4
Ash vs. Evil Ash Prime and his many mutants and monsters in a post-apocalyptic world. It was a four-issue story arc.

The Long Road Home (vol. 2) #5-8
A four-issue story arc that will follow the aftermath of Ash defeating Evil Ash Prime and his quest (with Sheila by his side) to repair the damage done to the world.

Home Sweet Hell (vol. 2) #9-12
A four-issue story-arc taking place after "The Long Road Home" written by James Kuhoric and Mike Raicht featuring Ash, having lost his memories and status as the "Chosen One", battling demons.

King For A Day (vol. 2) #13
Ash heads back to A.D. 1300 to find a way to destroy the Book of the Dead, but soon finds out that he was named king after Lord Arthur's death.

Hellbillies and Deadnecks (vol. 2) #14-17

Montezuma's Revenge (vol. 2) #18
The Necronomicon transports Ash to Mexico, against his will, where he is forced to stop an ancient god who has been revived.

Water, Water, Everywhere... (vol. 2) #19
A special self-contained story from writer Mike Raicht, joined here by artist Pablo Marcos. This storyline was originally untitled, but got named in Army of Darkness Omnibus Volume 3. Ash finds love with a woman named Georgia, only to find she is a murderous succubus and that there may be other Chosen Ones. Ash leaves her and prevents a deadite outbreak.

Ashley J. Williams Goes to Europe #20-21
In Europe, Ash meets a werewolf named Brad, a Protector, and learns that there are a line of Protectors, who protect the areas of the world. He also finds that many of the Chosen Ones before him have been taken over by Hell's Prophet, and have been the cause of many disasters throughout history. The only thing that has stopped Hell's Prophet is the League of Light. Ash and Brad set out to stop it before Hell's Prophet takes him over.

Ash and the League of Light #22-27
Ash travels to different continents of the world, recruiting other Protectors to help him defeat Hell's Prophet, which has possessed him. Unbeknownst to him, the very people he is gathering may end up being his undoing, as it is foretold the Protectors must kill him.

Ash dies and his new League of Light fails to stop Hell's Prophet from taking over, causing the world to go to Hell. Five years later, a time machine is made by the last surviving members of the League of Light, as they go back in time and stop Hell's Prophet from taking over Ash. The ghost of future Ash warns his past self in a note on what to do, and he saves the world; causing everything to snap back to normal.

Third series

Army of Darkness (Vol. 3) #1-13 
Ash has become a Deadite hunter for hire, fighting the evil all across the world. He also meets his female counterpart from another universe: Ashley K. Williams, saves his younger self from Deadites in the 1970s, and avenges his grandfather's death at the hands of 1920s gangsters.

Fourth series
Dynamite comics announced a reboot of their Army of Darkness line in 2013, starting with this new series.

Ash and the Army of Darkness (#1-8, Annual 2014) 
The story involves Ash and his entire S-Mart department store teleported to A.D. 1300 to help a Deadite Wise Man retrieve the Necronomicon that he lost. After defeating the Deadite Wise Man, Sheila is then possessed and leads her own "Army of Darkness" to take over the world.

Army of Darkness: Ash Gets Hitched (#1-4) 
Picking up from Ash and the Army of Darkness #8, Ash prepares for his wedding with Sheila by battling the Faceless Man, the most powerful monster he has ever fought.

Ash In Space (Vol. 4) #1-5 
Ash misses his honeymoon because he is sent back to the present day to stop a Deadite threat from taking over the International Space Station. Although it is officially labeled as Volume 4, the story is not set in the same continuity as the first three volumes.

Fifth series

Furious Road #1-6 
20 years from "now", Evil Ash (now going by the name of the General) has taken over the world, and both humans and supernatural monsters must team-up to undo the destruction of modern civilization, but there is only one problem, they need the Necronomicon Ex-Mortis, but its guardian, a 50+ year old Ash Williams, is not willing to work with monsters.

Evil Dead 2 
In 2015, Space Goat Publishing announced that they had acquired the rights to Evil Dead 2 and would begin producing comics based on characters from that film.

Beyond Dead By Dawn 
This story follows Annie Knowby and a copy of Ash Williams on their journey through Hell to not only find a way out, but to free the spirits of the Knowby family.

Cradle of the Damned (#1-3) 
Six months after escaping Hell and accidentally unleashing demons upon the Earth, Annie and the copy of Ash are accidentally sucked into the mirror dimension, where the Dark Ones were banished by the Chosen One.

Tales of The Ex-Mortis (#1-3) 
An anthology series about people in various times and places using the Necronomicon Ex-Mortis for their own personal gain.

Revenge of One-Shots 
Space Goat announced that alongside of the ongoing series, there would be a series of one-shots where Ash would battle both real and fictitious villains, the first being Evil Dead 2: The Revenge of Hitler published in March 2016.

Dark Ones Rising (#1-3) 
Ash and Annie accidentally release Cthulhu.

A Merry Deadite X-Mas (one-shot) 
Ash and Annie are summoned to a Deadite-infested Christmas theme park.

Other comics

Tales of Army of Darkness
A 48-page annual issue including five new stories by various writers and artists.

Army of Darkness Sketchbook
A jumbo-sized sketchbook published by Devils Due Publishing.

The Evil Dead (#1-4)
In January 2008, Dark Horse Comics released a four-issue comic book miniseries adapting The Evil Dead, which is written by Mark Verheiden, with art by John Bolton.

Ash's Christmas Horror (one-shot)
A 2008 Christmas special in which Ash tries to stop Evil Ash and a Deadite Santa from destroying Christmas.

Army of Darkness: Ash Saves Obama (#1-4) 
According to writer Elliott Serrano, it is not just a commentary on the many Barack Obama comic books but also "all the other trends that have occurred in comics over the decades."

Army of Darkness: Ash for President (one-shot) 
Ash is told by the Necronomicon that one of the three candidates in the 2016 Presidential Election is actually a demon known as "the Great Darkness", and it needs Ash's help to discover which candidate it is.

Crossovers

Army of Darkness vs. Re-Animator (#1-4)
Although this was a crossover, it served in the mainstream continuity of the series and shall be credited as part of the actual series.
Takes place after Shop till You Drop Dead.

Marvel Zombies vs. The Army of Darkness (#1-5)

A five-issue miniseries crossover with Marvel Comics set in the Marvel Zombies universe, also doubling as an origin story for that universe alongside the interlinked prequel Marvel Zombies: Dead Days. Marvel Comics has since designated the Army of Darkness series as Earth-818793 of the Marvel Comics Multiverse

Darkman vs. Army of Darkness (#1-4)
A crossover with another Sam Raimi film character, Darkman. It was written by Roger Stern and Kurt Busiek, with art by James Fry. It ran for four issues from August 2006 to March 2007 and the trade paperback was released in late 2007. The story features Darkman/Dr. Peyton Westlake's former love Julie accidentally reading the incantations of the Necronomicon, which unleashes a Deadite infestation throughout the city and transforms Julie into the Deadite Queen. Helping her friend Brynne Kelly escape with the book, the pair use it to open a portal and summon the 'Legendary Hero' to them - which turns out to be Ash Williams. Teaming up, the trio take on the army of Deadites - led by Darkman's deceased enemy Robert Durant - as they plan to use the book to help rid Julie of the evil inside her. The trio succeed in reversing the effects, freeing Julie and destroying the Deadite army. Ash and Brynne share a kiss before he disappears, while Darkman watches over Julie and her boyfriend Tony, understanding that his desire to save Julie cost the lives of others and that he will have to live with it.

Freddy vs. Jason vs. Ash (#1-6)

Based upon an unused script to a possible film sequel to Freddy vs. Jason, Wildstorm Comics and Dynamite co-published the story in comic form as the six-issue miniseries Freddy vs. Jason vs. Ash.

Freddy vs. Jason vs. Ash: The Nightmare Warriors (#1-6)

James Kuhoric and Jason Craig returning to write and illustrate, respectively. The story picks up where Freddy vs. Jason vs. Ash left off and featured cameos of known characters from the Friday the 13th and A Nightmare on Elm Street franchises.

Army of Darkness/Xena: Why Not? (#1-4)
A crossover with Xena: Warrior Princess, this four-issue miniseries concerns Ash travelling to Xena's dimension in order to stop a miniature version of himself from destroying that world.

Xena/Army of Darkness: What, Again? (#1-4)
A second crossover with Xena written by Brandon Jerwa and Elliott Serrano.

Army of Darkness/Xena: Forever... And a Day (#1-6) 
The third crossover between the two series features Ash encountering Xena during significant periods in her life.

Danger Girl and the Army of Darkness (#1-6)
A six-part crossover with IDW Publishing's Danger Girl characters which began in April, 2011.

Army of Darkness vs. Hack/Slash (#1-6)
A six-part crossover with Devil's Due Publishing's Cassie Hack began in July, 2013. Released by Dynamite Entertainment.

Army of Darkness/Re-Animator (one-shot)
Published in October 2013 by Dynamite Entertainment, the issue sees Ash sent back to a graveyard in the 1920s where he has another encounter with Dr. Herbert West.

Vampirella/Army of Darkness (#1-4)
A six-part crossover with Vampirella, who Dynamite currently has the rights to, began in July 2015. Released by Dynamite Entertainment.

Army of Darkness/Bubba Ho-Tep 
A crossover with Bubba Ho-Tep, another film with Bruce Campbell as the title character. Published through 2019 by Dynamite Entertainment.

Collected editions
The various stories and limited series have been collected into trade paperbacks.

Dynamite are also collecting all the comics into larger omnibus editions:
Omnibus Volume 1 (collects the first 18 issues including film adaptation and 6 stories from Tales of Army of Darkness, 488 pages, released in 2010)
Omnibus Volume 2 (collects the next 18 issues, 432 pages, released in April 2012)
Omnibus Volume 3 (collects the next 15 issues #13-27, 360 pages, released in April 2013)

Awards

2006: Won the "Best Screen-To-Comic Adaptation" Spike TV Scream Award
2008: Nominated for the "Best Scream-To-Comic-Adaptation" Spike TV Scream Award

Maquette
On May 11, 2005 it was announced that Dynamite Entertainment would be releasing a maquette based on J. Scott Campbell's cover of Army of Darkness: Ashes 2 Ashes #1. The maquette was sculpted by Anthony Colella and stands at 13” tall. It has a limited release of 150 pieces with 50 Artist Proofs being released at a later date. When released both the Maquette and AP held an MSRP of $149.99.

Other comics 
These comics either involve Ash Williams or are direct spin-offs of the Army of Darkness series:
 Re-Animator #0 (2005): A prelude to Army of Darkness vs. Re-Animator.
 Eva: Daughter of The Dragon #1 (one-shot): Takes place both before and after Army of Darkness: Ash vs. The Classic Monsters.
 Prophecy #1-7 (2012): Ash teams-up with other Dynamite Comics characters to save the world in 2012.
 Reanimator #1-4 (2015): After leaving Ash behind in 1922 after the events of Army of Darkness/Reanimator (2013), Herbert West returns to the 21st Century to perfect his re-animation formula.
 My Name Is Bruce (one-shot): Published by Dark Horse Comics, this comic follows actor Bruce Campbell as he is kidnapped by a teenager who has accidentally unleashed the Chinese god of war.

See also

List of comics based on films

Notes

References

External links
Evil Dead Comics at Deadites Online
Dark Horse comics details for issue #1, #2 and #3
Army of Darkness series by Dynamite

The Evil Dead (franchise) comics
Fantasy comics
Cthulhu Mythos comics